Memala is a small village in Puramattom panchayat, Pathanamthitta district, Kerala, India. The Peppara dam is near Memala.

References

Villages in Thiruvananthapuram district